Anamorphosis is the first EP by Norwegian black metal band Drottnar. This EP was limited to 850 copies and was released in 2003 on Momentum Scandinavia label. The packaging contains a black matte cardboard slipcase with black print and an embossed Drottnar logo.

Recording

The original bassist Bjarne Peder Lind left Drottnar before recording this EP, and he was replaced by Håvar Wormdahl. Also, a second guitarist, Bengt Olsson, joined the band for this EP's release. The release saw Drottnar abandoning their folk-influenced Viking black metal style for a more modern and highly technical black metal. Anamorphosis includes the intro "Morphosis" and three actual songs. Both the intro and "Sin Climax" contain violins.

Anamorphosis received mixed reviews. The EP was criticized for unbalanced soundscapes, dry and minimalistic drum sounds and lack of hooks.

Track listing

 "Morphosis" – 2:57
 "The Individual Complex" – 5:56
 "Sin Climax" – 6:58
 "Concord" – 5:03

Personnel
Sven-Erik Lind – vocals
Karl Fredrik Lind – guitar
Bengt Olsson – guitar
Håvar Wormdahl – bass
Glenn-David Lind – drums

References

External links
Anamorphosis @ Encyclopaedia Metallum
Anamorphosis @ The Whipping Post

2003 EPs
Drottnar albums
Unblack metal albums
Progressive metal EPs